Mirza Ebdilqadire Paweyi, (میرزا عەبدۆلقادری پاوەیی, Mîrza Ebdilqadirê Paweyî in Kurdish), (1850–1910), was a Kurdish poet and writer. Paweyi was born in of Paveh city in Iran.

References

1850 births
1910 deaths
Kurdish-language poets
Kurdish poets
Hawraman
People of Qajar Iran